Manfred Gelpke (born 3 March 1940) is a German rower who competed for East Germany in the 1968 Summer Olympics.

He was born in Dresden and was a member of SC Einheit Dresden. At the 1968 Olympics he was a crew member of the East German boat that won the silver medal in the coxed four event. He later studied at the Deutsche Hochschule für Körperkultur (DHfK) to become a physical education teacher and from 1978, he worked at a school in Dresden.

References

External links
 

1940 births
Living people
Olympic rowers of East Germany
Rowers at the 1968 Summer Olympics
Olympic silver medalists for East Germany
Rowers from Dresden
Olympic medalists in rowing
East German male rowers
Medalists at the 1968 Summer Olympics